Riko (written: , , ,  or  in hiragana) is a feminine Japanese given name. Notable people with the name include:

Riko Azuna (born 1993), Japanese singer
Riko E. Bishop (born 1956), Japanese judge
Riko Gunji (born 2002), Japanese badminton player
, Japanese professional golfer
, Japanese voice actress and guitarist
, Japanese illustrator and member of Kero Q and Makura
, Japanese idol and member of Keyakizaka46
, Japanese manga artist
Riko Mizuno (born 1932), Japanese gallerist
, Japanese physician and journalist
, Japanese actress and model
, Japanese women's footballer 
, Japanese ice hockey player
, Japanese actress. She changed her stage name to Ai Yoshikawa in 2017.
, Japanese footballer

Fictional characters
, a character from the media-mix project Love Live! Sunshine!!
Riko (リコ), a character from the mixed-media franchise Made In Abyss.
Riko Aida (相田 リコ Aida Riko), Seirin's basketball coach in Kuroko no Basuke.

Other people
Riko Simanjuntak,  Indonesian footballer

See also
Rico (name), given name and surname

Japanese feminine given names